The men's road race at the 1931 UCI Road World Championships was the fifth edition of the event. The race was held as an individual time trial rather than a mass start. The race took place on Wednesday 26 August 1931 in Copenhagen, Denmark. The race was won by Learco Guerra of Italy.

Final classification

References

Men's Road Race
UCI Road World Championships – Men's road race